State Route 19 (SR 19) is a  state highway that travels southeast-to-northwest through portions of Bacon, Jeff Davis, Appling, Telfair, Wheeler, Laurens, Twiggs, Bibb, and Monroe counties in the central part of the U.S. state of Georgia. The highway travels from its southern terminus at US 1/US 23/SR 4 north of Alma to its northern terminus at US 41/SR 18 in Forsyth. It also travels through Hazlehurst, Lumber City, Dublin, and Macon.

The brief portion, on US 80 in East Macon to US 23/US 80/US 129 Alt./SR 87 in Macon, is part of the Fall Line Freeway, a highway that connects Columbus and Augusta. It may eventually be incorporated into the proposed eastern extension of Interstate 14 (I-14).

Route description
SR 19 begins at an intersection with US 1/SR 4 north of Alma. The route travels north, concurrent with US 23, which is also concurrent with US 1/SR 4 south of here. Throughout much of this segment, US 23/SR 19 has standard rural Georgia surroundings, with its mix of wooded areas and local farmland. These routes also cross the Bacon-Appling County line before an intersection with Pine Level Church Road, then crosses the Jeff Davis County Line. North of the intersection with County Farm Road it heads back across the Appling County line, and returns to the Jeff Davis County line at the intersection of Ira Graham/Zora Road. Later they cross a bridge over the Little Satilla Creek, and after three more intersections with rural dirt roads encounters another bridge over the Big Satilla Creek and enters the community of Satilla. No major intersections exist within this community, and very few other paved roads exist. Nearing Hazlehurst, the routes brushes by a dirt road that used to be an old segment of Alma Highway before the continuing into the southern terminus of US 23 Bus./SR 135 Conn., while US 23/SR 19 turns right onto Larry Contos Boulevard, taking part of US 221 Truck/SR 135 Truck with it. The first intersection along this segment is that same former Alma Highway section, which is named "Old Alma Road" on the left side, and Davis Street on the right. From there, it passes by a power plant on the west side. The route officially enters the Hazlehurst City Limits between Currie Street and a railroad crossing for a former Southern Railway line (now the Norfolk Southern Railway's Brunswick District). Larry Contos Boulevard ends at US 341/SR 27  (a divided four-lane highway Designated the Golden Isles Parkway), and US 23/SR 19 turns northwest along this route. The first notable site along this segment is the combined Hazlehurst Fire Department and the Hazlehurst — Jeff Davis County Chamber of Commerce building on the northeast corner of Oak Street. Two block later, it crosses another railroad line just east of Walnut Street. Two blocks after this, it intersects with northbound US 221, and the truck routes for US 221/SR 135 officially comes to an end. US 23/US 341 and northbound US 221 travel for one block until the highways curve to the north at East Coffee (SR 19 Conn.) and West Jamar Streets, and northbound US 221 finally joins the southbound road once again at North Tallahassee Street, while southbound US 221 continues southbound along South Tallahassee Street.

The highways enter Telfair County by traveling over the Dr. C. R. Youmans Memorial Bridge over the Ocmulgee River where it enters Lumber City. SR 19 departs to the north at Victory Boulevard, leaving the US 23/US 341/SR 27 concurrency. From there, it crosses the Little Ocmulgee River, and begins to parallel the Oconee River to the north. In Jordan, SR 19 encounters the eastern termini of both former SR 134 and still existing SR 126 merely feet away from one another. In Glenwood the street name changes to Second Street and intersects US 280/SR 30 which is named Second Avenue. North of there, it resumes its rural characteristics and has an intersection with SR 46 and later the first of many interchanges with Interstate 16 (I-16), this one specifically at exit 54. In Dublin, SR 19 briefly travels concurrent with US 441 then turns west to join US 80/SR 26. The three highways travel northwest. In East Macon, SR 19 becomes concurrent with US 23 again, this time in another concurrency with SR 87. Later, in Macon, SR 19 leaves US 80/SR 87, and at exit 1A, on I-16 turns south on a wrong-way concurrency with US 129/SR 49. After crossing the Spring Street Bridge over the Ocmulgee River, US 23 turns northwest and US 129 turns southeast at Riverside Drive. Two blocks later, the wrong-way concurrency with SR 49 ends at Walnut Street and is replaced by a concurrency with US 41 Bus., and then, after a split-diamond interchange with I-75/SR 540, joins US 41. The highways travel north to Forsyth, where SR 18 travels concurrent with US 41, and SR 19 meets its northern terminus.

The following portions of SR 19, that are concurrent with U.S. Highways, are the only segments that are part of the National Highway System, a system of routes determined to be the most important for the nation's economy, mobility, and defense:
 The segment concurrent with US 23/US 341/SR 27 from Hazlehurst to Lumber City
 The segment concurrent with US 80/SR 26 from Dublin to the intersection with US 441 Byp./SR 117 west of the city
 The segment from SR 87 Conn. in East Macon to just northwest of an intersection with Zebulon Road, which is just northwest of Macon

History
SR 19 was established at least as early as 1919 from Glenwood to Barnesville. At this time, SR 15 was established on most of SR 19's current path south of Glenwood, but on a direct path from SR 32 in Alma. By the end of September 1921, the path of SR 15 between Glenwood and Wrightsville was shifted westward, replacing the path of SR 19 between Glenwood and Dublin. By October 1926, US 80 was designated on SR 19 from Dublin to Macon. US 41 was designated on SR 19 from Macon to Barnesville. US 341 was designated on SR 15/SR 27 from Hazlehurst to Lumber City. The path of SR 15 between Alma and Hazlehurst was rerouted. SR 15 and SR 32 traveled north-northeast from Alma and then split just north of the Bacon–Appling county line. Between September 1938 and July 1939, the northern terminus of SR 19 was truncated to just southeast of Forsyth, with SR 18 extended onto this former segment. At the end of 1940, US 129 was designated on the segment of SR 19 from east of Macon into the city. Between April 1949 and August 1950, US 23 was designated on two segments of SR 19: from north of Alma to Lumber City and from east of Macon to southeast of Forsyth. By the beginning of 1952, the entire current length of SR 19 was hard surfaced. Between July 1957 and June 1960, the path of SR 15 from north of Alma to Dublin was shifted eastward, with SR 19 extended onto the former path. Between June 1963 and the beginning of 1966, the path of US 41 in Macon was shifted westward. Its former path, which its northern part was concurrent with US 23 and SR 19, was redesignated as US 41 Bus. In 1971, the path of US 23, from Macon to southeast of Forsyth, was shifted eastward, off of US 41/SR 19 and onto SR 87.

In 1998, the Georgia state legislature passed a resolution designating a portion of SR 19 in Macon as "Duane Allman Boulevard" and a bridge thereon as the "Raymond Berry Oakley III Bridge" in honor and remembrance of Duane Allman and Berry Oakley, late founding members of The Allman Brothers Band.

Major intersections

Special routes

Hazlehurst business loop

State Route 19 Business (SR 19 Bus.) was a business route of SR 19 that existed completely within the city limits of Hazlehurst. In 1986, the path of US 23/SR 19 in the city was shifted eastward. Its former path, including the concurrent path of US 221/SR 135, was redesignated as SR 19 Bus. The next year, US 23 Bus. was established on the path of SR 19 Bus. In 1995, both US 23 Bus. and SR 19 Bus. were decommissioned. The portion not concurrent with US 221/SR 135 was redesignated as SR 135.

Hazlehurst connector route

State Route 19 Connector (SR 19 Conn.) is a  connector route that exists entirely within the city limits of Hazlehust in the north central part of Jeff Davis County, and is known as East Coffee Street for its entire length.

It begins at an intersection with US 221/SR 135 (South Tallahassee Street) in the central part of Hazlehurst. It heads northeast for two blocks and has a slight curve to the east. At that point, it meets its northern terminus, an intersection with US 23/US 341/SR 19/SR 27.

SR 19 Conn. is not part of the National Highway System, a system of roadways important to the nation's economy, defense, and mobility.

Between the beginning of 1995 and the beginning of 2009, SR 19 Conn. was established on its current path.

Bolingbroke spur route

State Route 19 Spur (SR 19 Spur) was a spur route of SR 19 in the northern part of the Macon metropolitan area. The roadway that would eventually become SR 19 Spur was designated between June 1954 and June 1955 as part of SR 148 from a point northeast of Bolingbroke to SR 87 east of the community. By the beginning of 1966, Interstate 75 (I-75) was in process of being extended through the state. It replaced SR 148 from northeast of Bolingbroke to east of the community, with this segment under construction. The remainder of SR 148 was redesignated as part of SR 19 Spur, which also connected with US 23/US 41/SR 19 in Bolingbroke. The spur route paralleled I-75 east-southeast to SR 87 northwest of Macon. Between the beginning of 1953 and the beginning of 1970, US 23 was shifted eastward, off of US 41/SR 19 and onto SR 87. In 1977, SR 19 Spur was decommissioned.

See also

References

External links

 Georgia Roads (Routes 1 - 20)
 Georgia State Route 19 on State-Ends.com

019
Transportation in Bacon County, Georgia
Transportation in Jeff Davis County, Georgia
Transportation in Appling County, Georgia
Transportation in Telfair County, Georgia
Transportation in Wheeler County, Georgia
Transportation in Laurens County, Georgia
Transportation in Twiggs County, Georgia
Transportation in Bibb County, Georgia
Transportation in Monroe County, Georgia
Dublin, Georgia micropolitan area
Transportation in Macon, Georgia
Macon metropolitan area, Georgia